Cynthia is a feminine given name of Greek origin: , , "from Mount Cynthus" on Delos island. The name has been in use in the Anglosphere since the 1600s. There are various spellings for this name, and it can be abbreviated to Cindy, Cyndi, Cyndy, or occasionally to Thea or Thia. 

Cynthia was originally an epithet of the Greek goddess Artemis, who according to legend was born on Mount Cynthus. Selene, the Greek personification of the moon, and the Roman Diana were also sometimes called "Cynthia".

Usage
It has ranked among the 1,000 most used names for girls in the United States since 1880 and among the top 100 names between 1945 and 1993. It peaked in usage between 1956 and 1963, when it was among the 10 most popular names for American girls. It has since declined in use in the United States and ranked in 806th position on the popularity chart there in 2021. It was also among the top 100 names in use for girls in Canada between 1949 and 1978,  among the top 100 names in use for girls in the United Kingdom between 1934 and 1944  among the top 500 names in France for girls between 1970 and 2008, and among the top 500 names in Spain between 1980 and 2010.

People 
Cynthia Bailey (born 1967), American model, actress, and TV personality
Cynthia or Cindy Bishop (born 1978), Thai model, actress, TV personality, and entrepreneur
Cynthia or Cindy Bremser (born 1953), American runner
Cynthia Clark (born 1942), American statistician
Cynthia Coffman (born 1962), American murderer
Cintia Dicker (born 1986), Brazilian model
Cynthia Dobrinski (born 1950), handbell composer
Cynthia Joan Gastelle (1961–1980), formerly unidentified American murder victim
Cynthia Germanotta (born 1954), American philanthropist
Cynthia Gibb (born 1963), American actress
Cynthia Glassman, American economist
Cynthia Gregory (born 1946), American ballet dancer
Cynthia or Cindy Greiner (born 1957), American heptathlete and long jumper
Cynthia Harvey, American ballet dancer and educator
Cynthia Herrup, American law historian
Cynthia Hotton (born 1969), Argentine politician
Cynthia Kenyon, American molecular biologist
Cynthia Tse Kimberlin, American ethnomusicologist
Cynthia Klitbo (born 1967), Mexican actress
Cyndi Lauper (born 1953), American musician and LGBT rights activist
Cynthia Ling Lee, American dancer and choreographer
Cynthia Lennon (1939–2015), first wife of musician John Lennon
Cynthia McKinney (born 1955), American politician
Cynthia, Christian name of Saori Minami (born 1954), Japanese singer
Lady Cynthia Mosley (1898–1933), British politician
Cynthia Newman, International Cybersecurity Analyst
Cynthia Nilson, Argentinian singer and songwriter
Cynthia Nixon (born 1966), American actress
Cynthia Olavarría (born 1982), Puerto Rican model
Cynthia Ortega (born 1956), Dutch politician
Cynthia Ozick (born 1928), American writer
Cynthia Richards (born 1944), Jamaican singer
Cynthia Dawn Ritchie, an American origin, socialite and blogger involved in Pakistani affairs
Cynthia Deyanira Rodríguez Ruiz (born 1984), Mexican reality TV personality
Cynthia Rothrock (born 1957), American martial artist and actress
Cynthia Rowley, American fashion designer
Cynthia Rudin (born 1976), American computer scientist and statistician
Cynthia Ryder (born 1966), American rower
Cynthia Morgan St. John (1852-1919), American Wordsworthian, book collector, and author
Amy Elizabeth Thorpe (1910–1963), an American spy codenamed "Cynthia"
Cynthia (Torres), American freestyle singer
Cynthia Valdez (born 1987), Mexican rhythmic gymnast
Cynthia Villar (born 1950), Filipino politician
Cynthia Watros (born 1968), American actress
Cynthia Weil (born 1940), American songwriter
Cynthia Wesley (1949-1963), a victim of the 1963 16th Street Baptist Church bombing
Cynthia Woodhead (born 1964), American athlete

Fictional characters 
 Cynthia, with certain Sonnets, and the legend of Cassandra, panegyric by Richard Barnfield (1574–1620)
 Cynthia’s Revels, play by Ben Jonson (1572–1637)
 Cynthia, Angelica's doll on the cartoon Rugrats
 Sinthia Schmidt, a.k.a. Sin (Marvel Comics), comic book supervillainess
 Cynthia, a plaster mannequin of the 1930s created by Lester Gaba.
 Cynthia, a diclonius and one of four clones of Mariko in the manga "Elfen Lied"
 Cynthia, the champion of the Sinnoh region in the Pokémon video games.
 Cynthia, a character in Fire Emblem Awakening
 Cynthia Lamonde, a major character in the book "Praise" by Andrew McGahan
 Cynthia Mitchell, antagonist in Lucky Stiff played by Donna Dixon
 Cynthia, a central character in the poetry of Propertius
 Cynthia Kirkpatrick, a character in Wives and Daughters by Elizabeth Gaskell

See also
 Cindy (given name)

Notes

References
 Pannen, Imke,  When the Bad Bleeds: Mantic Elements in English Renaissance Revenge Tragedy. Volume 3 of Representations & Reflections; V&R unipress GmbH, 2010. 

Feminine given names
English feminine given names
Epithets of Artemis

ja:シンシア
pt:Cynthia
sl:Hijacinta